Salma Zafar is a Pakistani actress. She is known for her roles in dramas Yeh Zindagi Hai, Kaash Main Teri Beti Na Hoti, Humsafar and Zebaish.

Early life
Salma was born on 10th August 1965 in Karachi, Pakistan. She completed her studies from University of Karachi. She started acting in theater on stage plays and dramas.

Career
Salma then appeared in dramas on PTV such as Aahat, Nijaat, Khala Kulsum Ka Kumba, Paadash, Bewafaiyan and Tumse Kehna Tha. She was noted for her role in drama Lyari Express on PTV. She also appeared in the drama Yeh Zindagi Hai and Yeh Zindagi Hai Season 2 as Saeeda which was the longest-running television series. Since then she appeared in dramas Ghar Damad, Mera Kiya Qasoor, Aslam Bahi & Company, Rishtey Kachay Dhagoon Se and Bubbly Kya Chahti Hai.

Personal
She was married to Tariq Mehmood for 22 years. They are divorced and have two daughters. Salma's father Zafar Khursheed was a music composer who composed tunes for advertisements Tullo Oil and Lipton Tea. Salma father died in 1970s when she was young.

Filmography

Television

Telefilm

Film

Awards and nominations

References

External links
 
 
 

1965 births
Living people
20th-century Pakistani actresses
Pakistani television actresses
21st-century Pakistani actresses
Pakistani film actresses